Blaich ( – as a noun, "buttermilk", or as a verb, "to heat/warm up") is a small community, on the south shore of Loch Eil on the  A861 road, near Fort William, in the Ardgour area, Highlands of Scotland.

Gallery

References

Populated places in Lochaber